Ubiquitin-conjugating enzyme E2 O is a protein that in humans is encoded by the UBE2O gene. 

UBE2O functions during terminal erythroid differentiation to eliminate generic cellular components in parallel with abundant synthesis of hemoglobin.

References

Further reading